Alan Watt (born 10 July 1967) is a former Scotland national rugby union team international rugby union player. He played for Glasgow High Kelvinside, Currie and Hillhead Jordanhill - as well as Glasgow Warriors.

Rugby Union career

Amateur career

Watt was born in Glasgow. He went to school at Kelvinside Academy.

Watt played prop for Glasgow High Kelvinside. He moved to Currie in 1996.

In 2000, while still contracted to Glasgow Warriors, he was assigned to Hillhead Jordanhill RFC.

Provincial and professional career

Before turning professional, Watt played for the provincial Glasgow District side.

He was signed in 1999 by Glasgow Warriors, then as Glasgow Caledonians.

His competitive debut for the Warriors was on 3 September 1999 at home to Pontypridd RFC in the Welsh–Scottish League. The Warriors played that match at Bridgehaugh Park in Stirling. Watt has the Glasgow Warriors No. 69.

Despite 20 competitive appearances for Caledonians, he was released by them in March 2001.

International career

He played wing-forward for Scottish Schools in 1984.

He was capped by Scotland 'B' to play against France 'B' on 2 March 1991.

He made his international senior debut at Murrayfield against Zimbabwe during the group stages of the 1991 Rugby World Cup. His final international appearance was against Argentina at Buenos Aires in 1994.

References

1967 births
Living people
Rugby union players from Glasgow
Scottish rugby union players
Scotland international rugby union players
Rugby union props
Glasgow Warriors players
Hillhead Jordanhill players
Currie RFC players
Glasgow District (rugby union) players